The United Democratic Youth Organisation (Greek: Ενιαία Δημοκρατική Οργάνωση Νεολαίας), commonly referred to by its transliterated initials EDON, is the youth wing of the Progressive Party of Working People (transliterated initials AKEL), a communist political party in Cyprus. Founded in 1959, it is one of the two main parties in Cyprus and is in opposition to NEDISY, the youth wing of the liberal-conservative Democratic Rally party, which has been in power since 2013.

Political beliefs
The organization supports a federal solution to the Cyprus dispute. It responded negatively to the Annan Plan and supports rapprochement with the Turkish Cypriots. It is a member of the World Federation of Democratic Youth.

Participation in events
The organization takes part in events organised by AKEL and annually demonstrates on 18 July to commemorate its opposition to the Greek junta and the Turkish invasion of Cyprus. It takes part in the main conferences of AKEL, which are held every five years and are attended by thousands of supporters. It also organizes its own conferences.

In June 2020, as part of the worldwide protests against police brutality, around 250 EDON members demonstrated peacefully outside the U.S. embassy in Nicosia.

References

Political parties in Cyprus
Youth wings of communist parties